Bochokh is a rural locality (a selo) in Shidibsky Selsoviet, Tlyaratinsky District, Republic of Dagestan, Russia. The population was 81 as of 2010.

Geography 
Bochokh is located 23 km northwest of Tlyarata (the district's administrative centre) by road. Khantakolob is the nearest rural locality.

References 

Rural localities in Tlyaratinsky District